Tethea is a genus of moths belonging to the family Drepanidae and subfamily Thyatirinae. It was first described by Ferdinand Ochsenheimer in 1816.

Species
Subgenus Saronaga Moore, 1881
Tethea albicosta (Moore, 1867)
Tethea consimilis (Warren, 1912)
Tethea consimilis aurisigna (Bryk, 1943)
Tethea consimilis c-album (Matsumura, 1931)
Tethea consimilis commifera (Warren, 1912)
Tethea consimilis congener (Roepke, 1945)
Tethea oberthueri (Houlbert, 1921)
Subgenus Tethea
Tethea albicostata (Bremer, 1861)
Tethea ampliata (Butler, 1878)
Tethea ampliata grandis Okano, 1959
Tethea ampliata shansiensis Werny, 1966
Tethea fusca Werny, 1966
Tethea longisigna Laszlo, G.Ronkay, L.Ronkay & Witt, 2007
Tethea octogesima (Butler, 1878)
Tethea octogesima watanabei (Matsumura, 1931)
Tethea ocularis (Linnaeus, 1767)
Tethea or (Denis & Schiffermüller, 1775)
Tethea punctorenalia Houlbert, 1921
Tethea subampliata (Houlbert, 1921)
Tethea trifolium (Alpheraky, 1895)

References

Thyatirinae
Drepanidae genera